Acacia lateriticola is a shrub of the genus Acacia and the subgenus Pulchellae that is endemic to an area of south western Australia.

Description
The proximal pinnae are composed of one to three pairs of pinnules while the distal pinnae have two to six pairs of pinnules. It blooms from May to October and produces yellow flowers.

Taxonomy
The species was first formally described by the botanist Bruce Maslin in 1975 as a part of the work Studies in the genus Acacia (Mimosaceae) - A Revision of Series Pulchellae as published in the journal Nuytsia. It was reclassified as Racosperma lateriticola by Leslie Pedley in 2003 then transferred back to genus Acacia in 2006.

Distribution
It is native to an area in the Peel and South West regions of Western Australia where it is usually found growing in lateritic soils. The bulk of the population is found from around Chittering in the north to Manjimup in the east and Dunsborough in the south where it is often a part of Eucalyptus marginata and Corymbia calophylla woodland and forest communities.

See also
 List of Acacia species

References

lateriticola
Endemic flora of Southwest Australia
Taxa named by Bruce Maslin
Plants described in 1975